Gender-neutral language or gender-inclusive language is language that avoids bias towards a particular sex or gender. In English, this includes use of nouns that are not gender-specific to refer to roles or professions, formation of phrases in a coequal manner, and discontinuing the blanket use of male or female terms. For example, the words policeman and stewardess are gender-specific job titles; the corresponding gender-neutral terms are police officer and flight attendant. Other gender-specific terms, such as actor and actress, may be replaced by the originally male term; for example, actor used regardless of gender. Some terms, such as chairman, that contain the component -man but have traditionally been used to refer to persons regardless of sex are now seen by some as gender-specific. An example of forming phrases in a coequal manner would be using husband and wife instead of man and wife. Examples of discontinuing the blanket use of male terms in English are referring to those with unknown or indeterminate gender as singular they, and using humans, people, or humankind, instead of man or mankind.

History 
The notion that parts of the English language were sexist was brought to mainstream attention in Western English cultures by feminists in the 1970s. Simultaneously, the link between language and ideologies (including traditional gender ideologies) was becoming apparent in the academic field of linguistics. In 1975, the National Council of Teachers of English published a set of guidelines on the use of "non-sexist" language. Backlash ensued, as did the debate on whether gender-neutral language ought to be enforced. In Britain, feminist Maija Blaubergs' countered eight commonly used oppositional arguments in 1980. In 1983, New South Wales, Australia required the use of they in place of he and she in subsequent laws. In 1985, the Canadian Corporation for Studies in Religion passed a motion for all its ensuing publications to include "non-sexist" language. By 1995, academic institutions in Canada and Britain had implemented "non-sexist" language policies. More recently, revisions to the Women's Press publications of The Handbook of Nonsexist Writing and The A–Z of Non-Sexist Language were made to de-radicalize the original works. In 2006, "non-sexist" was challenged: the term refers solely to the absence of sexism. In 2018, the State of New York enacted policy to formally use the gender-neutral terms police officer and firefighter.

Terminology and views

General
Historically, the use of masculine pronouns in place of generic was regarded as non-sexist, but various forms of gender-neutral language have become a common feature in written and spoken versions of many languages in the late twentieth century. Feminists argue that previously the practice of assigning masculine gender to generic antecedents stemmed from language reflecting "the prejudices of the society in which it evolved, and English evolved through most of its history in a male-centered, patriarchal society." During the 1970s, feminists Casey Miller and Kate Swift created a manual, The Handbook of Nonsexist Writing, on gender neutral language that was set to reform the existing sexist language that was said to exclude and dehumanize women. In 1995, the Women's Press published The A–Z of Non-Sexist Language, by Margaret Doyle. Both publications were written by American authors, originally without the consideration of the British-English dialect. Many feminist efforts were made to reform the androcentric language. It has become common in some academic and governmental settings to rely on gender-neutral language to convey inclusion of all sexes or genders (gender-inclusive language).

Various languages employ different means to achieve gender neutrality:
 Gender neutrality in languages with grammatical gender
 Gender neutrality in genderless languages
 Gender neutrality in English

Other particular issues are also discussed:
 Gender marking in job titles
 Gender-specific and gender-neutral pronouns

Gender indication
There are different approaches in forming a "gender-neutral language":
 Neutralising any reference to gender or sex, like using "they" as a third-person singular pronoun instead of "he" or "she", and proscribing words like actress (female actor) and prescribing the use of words like actor for persons of any gender. Although it has generally been accepted in the English language, some argue that using "they" as a singular pronoun is considered grammatically incorrect, but acceptable in informal writing.
Creating alternative gender-neutral pronouns, such as "hir" or "hen" in Swedish.
 Indicating the gender by using wordings like "he or she" and "actors and actresses". 
 Avoiding the use of "him/her" or the third-person singular pronoun "they" by using "the" or restructuring the sentence all together to avoid all three.
 NASA now prefers the use of "crewed" and "uncrewed" instead of "manned" and "unmanned", including when discussing historical spaceflight (except proper nouns).

Controversy

Canada 
University of Toronto psychology professor Jordan Peterson uploaded a video to YouTube expressing his opposition to Bill C-16 – An Act to amend the Canadian Human Rights Act and the Criminal Code, a bill introduced by Justin Trudeau's government, in October 2016. The proposed piece of legislation was to add the terms "gender identity" and "gender expression" to the Canadian Human Rights Act and to the Criminal Code's hate crimes provisions. In the video, Peterson argued that legal protection of gender pronouns results in "compelled speech", which would violate the right to freedom of expression outlined in the Canadian Charter of Rights and Freedoms. In the view of Peterson, legal pronoun protections would force an individual to say something that one opposes. The bill passed in the House of Commons and in the Senate, becoming law once it received Royal Assent on 19 June 2017. In response to the passing of the bill, Peterson has stated he will not use gender-neutral pronouns if asked in the classroom by a student.

France 
The dictionary's director, Charles Bimbenet, stated it was added as researchers noted "an increasing usage" of the neutral pronoun in "a large body of texts drawn from various sources." However, a number of French politicians have opposed the new addition.

Jean-Michel Blanquer, the French Minister of Education, publicly tweeted: "inclusive writing is not the future of the French language." Similarly, François Jolivet, a French politician, accused the dictionary of pushing a "woke" ideology that "undermines [their] common language and its influence", in a letter addressed to the Académie Française. The controversy weighs into the ongoing debate regarding masculine dominance in the French language.

United States 
The American English language contains gendered connotations that make it challenging for gender-neutral language to achieve the desired linguistic equality. "Male default" is especially prominent in the United States and often when gender-neutral language is used around traditionally male institutions, the neutrality doesn't prevent people from automatically translating "they" to the default "he." A study conducted in June 2021 at UCLA School of Law Williams Institute found that 1.2 Million LGBTQ adults identify as nonbinary.

Argentina 
Argentina's capital, Buenos Aires, implemented a policy in June 2022 that forbade public educational institutions from using gender-neutral language on the basis gender-neutral language is grammatically incorrect and causes developmental learning issues for students. In the Spanish language nouns are either feminine (usually ending in "a") or masculine (usually ending in "o"), but in recent years gender-neutral endings like "x" and "e" have gained popularity; For example, "Latinx" has become the gender-neutral option for the previously binary "Latino" or "Latina." Buenos Aires' objection to gender-neutral language in the classroom stems from concerns about linguistic correctness and preservation of the Spanish language. Those who support the development of gender-neutral language have expressed frustration with the male-dominance of the Spanish language: a group of students who are all female is "compañeras," but if one male student enters the group, the grammatically correct term for the students becomes "compañeros" with the masculine "o" ending.

Italy 
The Italian language contains grammatical gender where nouns are either masculine or feminine with corresponding gendered pronouns, which differs from English in that nouns do not encode grammatical gender. For example, "tavola" (in English table) in Italian is feminine. Developing a gender-neutral option in Italian is linguistically challenging because the Italian language marks only the masculine and feminine grammatical genders: "friends" in Italian is either "amici" or "amiche" where the masculine "-i" pluralized ending is used as an all-encompassing term, and "amiche" with the feminine "-e" pluralized ending refers specifically to a group of female friends. Italian linguistically derived from Latin, which does contain a third "neuter" or neutral option.

The use of a schwa <ə> has been suggested to create an Italian gender-neutral language option. Some Italian linguists have signed a petition opposing the use of the schwa on the basis it's not linguistically correct. Other solutions proposed are the asterisk <*>, the <x>, the at sign <@>, the <u> and omitting gender-specific suffixes altogether.

See also

In specific languages
Gender neutrality in languages with grammatical gender
Gender neutrality in English
Gender neutrality in Spanish
Gender neutrality in Portuguese

Related topics
 Epicenity
 Gender in Bible translation
 Gender binary
 Gender neutrality
 Gender role
 Genderless language
 Generic antecedent
 International Gender and Language Association, an interdisciplinary academic organization
 Markedness
 Non-binary gender
 Unisex name
 Gender-neutral pronoun
 Neopronoun
 Spivak pronoun
 Ri (pronoun), Esperanto
 Elle (Spanish pronoun)
 Hen (pronoun), Swedish
 Iel (pronoun), French
Pronoun game
 Feminist language reform
 Lavender linguistics
 Gender marking in job titles

References

Further reading

 
 
 
 
 
 
 
 
 
 
 

 
Etiquette
Sociolinguistics
Feminist terminology
Linguistic controversies